Alfred Brunson (February 9, 1793 – August 3, 1882) was an American Methodist circuit rider, lawyer, and territorial legislator.

Born in Danbury, Connecticut, Brunson served in the War of 1812. Brunson was a Methodist church circuit rider in Ohio and Pennsylvania. In 1835, he moved to Prairie du Chien, Michigan Territory and was a Methodist circuit rider. He studied law and was admitted to the Wisconsin bar in 1839. He served in the Wisconsin Territorial House of Representatives of the Wisconsin Territorial Legislature from 1840 to 1841 as a Whig.

During the American Civil War, Brunson served as a chaplain of the 31st Wisconsin Volunteer Infantry Regiment. He retired from the ministry in 1871. He also wrote including his autobiography. His son was Ira B. Brunson who also served in the Wisconsin Territorial Legislature. His son in law was Thomas P. Burnett. Brunson died in Prairie du Chien, Wisconsin.

Notes

1793 births
1882 deaths
Politicians from Danbury, Connecticut
People from Prairie du Chien, Wisconsin
United States Army personnel of the War of 1812
People of Wisconsin in the American Civil War
Methodist circuit riders
Wisconsin lawyers
Wisconsin Whigs
Writers from Connecticut
Writers from Wisconsin
Members of the Wisconsin Territorial Legislature
19th-century American politicians
United States Army soldiers
Union Army chaplains
19th-century American clergy